Eleusine is a genus of Asian, African, and South American plants in the grass family, sometimes called by the common name goosegrass. One species (Eleusine indica), is a widespread weed in many places. Another species Eleusine coracana, is finger millet, cultivated as a cereal grain in India and parts of Africa.

 Species
 Eleusine africana – Africa (from South Africa to Egypt + Senegal), Madagascar, Comoros, Sinai, Saudi Arabia, Yemen, Oman
 Eleusine coracana – tropical Africa; naturalized in parts of Asia (Arabia, India, China, Japan, Indonesia, etc.), Western Australia, Fiji, Micronesia, etc.
 Eleusine floccifolia – Eritrea, Ethiopia, Somalia, Yemen
 Eleusine indica – Asia, Africa, Papuasia; naturalized in Mediterranean, Australia, Americas, various islands
 Eleusine intermedia – Kenya, Ethiopia
 Eleusine jaegeri – Kenya, Ethiopia, Tanzania, Uganda
 Eleusine kigeziensis  – Ethiopia, Uganda, Zaïre, Rwanda, Burundi
 Eleusine multiflora – Kenya, Ethiopia, Tanzania, Eritrea, Yemen, Saudi Arabia; naturalized in South Africa, Mexico, Lesotho
 Eleusine semisterilis – Kenya
 Eleusine tristachya – Brazil, Bolivia, Paraguay, Uruguay, Argentina, Chile incl Juan Fernández Islands

 formerly included
numerous species once included in Eleusine but now considered better suited to other genera: Acrachne Aeluropus Chloris Coelachyrum Dactyloctenium Dinebra Disakisperma Eragrostis Harpochloa Leptochloa Ochthochloa Sclerodactylon Uniola Wangenheimia

References

External links
 Jepson Manual Treatment
 Grass Manual Treatment

Chloridoideae
Poaceae genera